West Knighton is a community in Leicester in the United Kingdom.

West Knighton's boundaries include Knighton Fields Road East to the North, Welford Road to the East, the London-bound railway line to the West and the Leicester City boundary to the South (a line just South of Asquith Way/Blvd) in Leicestershire. 

West Knighton was mostly constructed during the 1950s and contains a variety of semi-detached and detached housing, council allotments.  It also contains Lancaster Academy and Sir Jonathan North Community College. It is part of Knighton ward and of Leicester South constituency.

External links
Leicester City
Lancaster School 
Sir Jonathan North Community College*

Areas of Leicester